Deak Evgenikos is an American actress originally from New Jersey. Her date of birth is December 13, 1977.  She is best known for her role in Jamie Babbit's film Itty Bitty Titty Committee, a girl-powered romantic comedy that explores themes such as lesbianism and female empowerment.
 
Evgenikos graduated from Sarah Lawrence College before beginning her acting career, starring in Guinevere Turner's short film "Hummer" in 2003. She appeared in the films "Frozen Smile" and "Hung" in 2005 before being cast in the role of Meat in Itty Bitty Titty Committee. Go Magazine listed her as one of its "100 Women We Love."

Filmography

References

External links

 http://www.gomag.com/article/100_women_we_love1/91

Actresses from New Jersey
Living people
Year of birth missing (living people)
21st-century American women